Bedoya may refer to:

 Bedhaya, also rendered as Bedoya, an Indonesian sacred dance
 Bedoya (surname), including a list of people with the name